WAEB (790 kHz) is a news, talk and sports AM radio station in Allentown, Pennsylvania, in the Lehigh Valley region of eastern Pennsylvania.

The station is owned by iHeartMedia, Inc.

History
WAEB began operations in 1949. The station was sold to Rust Broadcasting in 1957, adopting a Top 40 format and the slogan Music Radio 79 WAEB.

In 1983, the station began to evolve into more of a hot adult contemporary format, and by 1985, more of a straight adult contemporary format emphasizing oldies. In 1986, WAEB added evening syndicated talk shows, and overnight talk shows were added by 1989; but continued to air a mix of adult contemporary and oldies music during the day.

WAEB and WAEB-FM were sold to CRB Broadcasting in the late 1980s. In 1992, WAEB dropped its music formats and the station evolved into a News/Talk format. In 1995, WAEB and WAEB-FM were sold to Capstar along with WZZO and WKAP. The stations all went to AMFM Broadcasting as a result of the Chancellor/Capstar merger in 1999.

When AMFM merged with Clear Channel Communications, which owned WODE-FM and WEEX, the company would be forced to sell an AM and FM station to be under legal ownership limits. Clear Channel would give Nassau Broadcasting cash plus WODE-FM and WEEX in exchange for New Jersey stations WSUS, WNNJ, WNNJ-FM, WHCY, and local marketing agreements with WDLC, and WTSX. As a result, WAEB, WAEB-FM, WZZO and WKAP became Clear Channel stations.

In January 2007, after WKAP dropped the oldies format in favor of religious programming (also changing its call letters to WYHM), WAEB launched an Internet radio station playing Oldies music on its Web site.  Strong demand still exists for an AM or FM station dedicated to the oldies format lost when WKAP changed its format.

On September 4, 2009, the northernmost tower mast of the station's five-tower antenna array located in Whitehall Township was toppled when a vandal or vandals cut the tower's guy wires.

Programming
WAEB currently runs a standard slate of news talkers typical of Clear Channel Communications owned stations. This includes Glenn Beck Program, The Rush Limbaugh Show, The Sean Hannity Show, The Savage Nation, and Coast to Coast AM. In addition, the station also airs a local morning show hosted by Bobby Gunther Walsh.

See also
Media in the Lehigh Valley

References

External links
.

1949 establishments in Pennsylvania
IHeartMedia radio stations
News and talk radio stations in the United States
Radio stations established in 1949
AEB